The Famous 1938 Carnegie Hall Jazz Concert by Benny Goodman, Columbia Records catalogue item SL-160, is a two-disc LP of swing and jazz music recorded at Carnegie Hall in New York City on January 16, 1938. First issued in 1950, the landmark recording captured the premiere performance given by a big band in the famed concert venue. The event has been described as "the single most important jazz or popular music concert in history: jazz's 'coming out' party to the world of 'respectable' music."

The title, mastered from preserved acetates, was among jazz's first double albums, first live recordings, and first to sell over a million copies. One of the earliest records of Benny Goodman music issued on the new long-playing format, the concert recording was also sold in a set of nine 45 rpm records in 1950 by Columbia.  The subsequent discovery of the aluminum studio masters made from the original recording resulted in several high-quality CD reissues beginning in 1998.

Background
In late 1937, Goodman's publicist, Wynn Nathanson, suggested that Goodman and his band should play Carnegie Hall in New York City. If such a concert were to take place, then Goodman would be the first jazz bandleader to perform at Carnegie Hall. "Benny Goodman was initially hesitant about the concert, fearing for the worst; however, when his film Hollywood Hotel opened to rave reviews and giant lines, he threw himself into the work. He gave up several dates and insisted on holding rehearsals inside Carnegie Hall to familiarize the band with the lively acoustics."

The concert was held on the evening of January 16, 1938. It sold out weeks in advance, with the capacity 2,760 seats going for a top price of US$2.75 a seat.

Concert
The concert began with three contemporary numbers from the Goodman band—"Don't Be That Way", "Sometimes I'm Happy", and "One O'Clock Jump". They then played a history of jazz, starting with a Dixieland quartet performing "Sensation Rag", originally recorded by the Original Dixieland Jazz Band in 1918. Once again, the initial reaction of the audience, though polite, was tepid. Then came a jam session on "Honeysuckle Rose" featuring members of the Count Basie and Duke Ellington bands as guests. (The surprise of the session: Goodman handing a solo to Basie's guitarist Freddie Green, who was never a featured soloist but earned his reputation as the best rhythm guitarist in the genre—he responded with a striking round of chord improvisations.) As the concert went on, things livened up. The Goodman band and quartet took over the stage and performed the numbers that had made them famous. Some later trio and quartet numbers were well received, and the vocal by Martha Tilton on "Loch Lomond" provoked five curtain calls and cries for an encore. The encore forced Goodman to make his only audience announcement for the night, stating that they had no encore prepared but that Martha would return shortly with another number.

By the time the band reached the climactic piece "Sing, Sing, Sing (With a Swing)", success was assured. This performance featured playing by the tenor saxophonist Babe Russin, the trumpeter Harry James, and Goodman, backed by the drummer Gene Krupa. When Goodman finished his solo, he unexpectedly gave a solo to the pianist, Jess Stacy. "At the Carnegie Hall concert, after the usual theatrics, Jess Stacy was allowed to solo and, given the venue, what followed was appropriate," wrote David Rickert. "Used to just playing rhythm on the tune, he was unprepared for a turn in the spotlight, but what came out of his fingers was a graceful, impressionistic marvel with classical flourishes, yet still managed to swing. It was the best thing he ever did, and it's ironic that such a layered, nuanced performance came at the end of such a chaotic, bombastic tune."

Original recording(s)
There is much confusion about how the live concert was recorded for posterity.  At least three studios were involved in making a synchronized pair of acetates (at two, working together) and a set of aluminum masters (at the third). Although it had long been believed the sound was captured by a single overhead mic at Carnegie Hall, the notes to the 1998 release by Phil Schaap on Sony claim that mic was not working that evening and "at least three other mics were used." The acetates became the basis for the original 1950 double-LP album release. The higher quality metal masters were used for subsequent CD remasters.

CD reissues based on the metal masters were released in 1998, 2002 and 2006.

Reception

The original 1950 long-playing double-album was very well received. As technology improved the material was re-released in digital format, with new versions produced both in the 1980s and 1990s.

Bruce Eder, writing for AllMusic, generally praises the 1999 double-CD release, noting the compromise between clear reproduction of sonic detail and retaining surface noise from the source material.

The Penguin Guide to Jazz Recordings includes the 1999 release in its "Core Collection," in addition to giving it a four-star rating (of a possible four). Penguin authors Richard Cook and Brian Morton describe the release as "a model effort, masterminded by Phil Schaap, whose indomitable detective work finally tracked down the original acetates and gave us the music in the best sound we'll ever get; with powerful, even thrilling, ambience."

1950 track listing

1999 Compact disc reissue track listing

Disc one

Disc two

Disc one, track 1 and disc two, tracks 20–28 are edited from comments recorded by Benny Goodman in 1950 and pressed onto a 12" 78 rpm record that was sent to radio station DJs at the time of the original double-album release. It was accompanied by a script suggesting ways to use it.<ref>Liner notes from 1999 reissue.</ref>

Personnel

The Benny Goodman Orchestra
 Benny Goodman, clarinet, vocal, and leader
 Chris Griffin, Ziggy Elman, Harry James, trumpets
 Red Ballard, Vernon Brown, trombones
 George Koenig, Art Rollini, Babe Russin, Hymie Schertzer, reed instruments
 Jess Stacy, piano
 Teddy Wilson, piano (BG trio and quartet only)
 Lionel Hampton, vibraphone (BG quartet only)
 Allan Reuss, guitar
 Harry Goodman, bass
 Gene Krupa, drums
 Martha Tilton, vocal

Additional performers
 Buck Clayton, trumpet
 Bobby Hackett, cornet
 Cootie Williams, trumpet
 Harry Carney, baritone saxophone
 Johnny Hodges, soprano and alto saxophones
 Lester Young, tenor saxophone
 Count Basie, piano
 Freddie Green, guitar
 Walter Page, bass

Literature
 James Lincoln Collier: Benny Goodman and the Swing Era. 
 Jon Hancock: " Benny Goodman – 'The Famous 1938 Carnegie Hall Jazz Concert' ". , Prancing Fish Publishing (May 2009)
 Irving Kolodin: Liner Notes (Benny Goodman – Carnegie Hall Concert)
 Catherine Tackley: 'Benny Goodman's Famous 1938 Carnegie Hall Jazz Concert', Oxford: Oxford University Press 2013

Notes

References

1938 in American music
1938 in New York City
1950 live albums
Albums produced by George Avakian
Albums produced by Phil Schaap
Albums recorded at Carnegie Hall
Benny Goodman albums
Columbia Records live albums
Grammy Hall of Fame Award recipients
Legacy Recordings live albums
United States National Recording Registry recordings